Luis Sequeira is a Canadian costume designer of Portuguese descent. He is best known for his frequent collaborations with Mexican director Guillermo del Toro and has been nominated two times for an Academy Award for Best Costume Design on two of his films: The Shape of Water (2017) and Nightmare Alley (2021).

Filmography
 Nightmare Alley
 Monster Problems
 It – Chapter Two
 The Christmas Chronicles
 The Shape of Water
 The Strain
 The Thing
 F/X: The Series
 Thomas and the Magic Railroad
 Code Name: Eternity
 Highwaymen 
 Flash of Genius
 Being Erica
 Mama

Awards and nominations
 Academy Award for Best Costume Design
 BAFTA Award for Best Costume Design
 Critics' Choice Movie Award for Best Costume Design
 Costume Designers Guild Award for Excellence in Period Film

References

External links

Living people
Canadian costume designers
Canadian people of Portuguese descent
Year of birth missing (living people)
Place of birth missing (living people)